Emerickville is an unincorporated community in Jefferson County, in the U.S. state of Pennsylvania.

History
Emerickville contained a post office between 1854 and 1906.

References

Unincorporated communities in Jefferson County, Pennsylvania
Unincorporated communities in Pennsylvania